Lawksawk, also known as Yatsawk was a Shan state in what is today Burma. It was located north of Myelat and belonged to the Central Division of the Southern Shan States. Its capital was Lawksawk town. The state included 397 villages and the population was mostly Shan, but there were also Danu, Pa-O and Palaung people in the area.

History
Lawksawk State was founded in 1630. According to tradition a predecessor state named Rathawadi had existed previously in the area. Between 1881 and 1886 the state was attacked and occupied by Yawnghwe.

Lawksawk included the substate of Mongping (Möngping), located in the southeastern part and separated from Lawksawk State proper by the Nam Et River.

Rulers (title Saopha) 
Ritual style Kambawsa Rahta Maha Thiriwuntha Thudama.
1680 - 1707                Pai Hkam
1707 - 1729                Shwe Gyaw
1729 - 1753                Hkun Shwe Tha
1753 - Jul 1760            Tha Pun Minaung
1760 - 1763                Maung Gyi
1763 - Jul 1790            Shwe Yi
Jul 1790 - 1791            Vacant
1791 - 1792                Maung Kywet                        (d. 1792)
1791 - 1811                Hkun Sam Lik 
1811 - 1812                Vacant
May 1812 - 1813            On Gaing                           (d. 1834) 
1813 - 1850                Hkun Shwe Ek                       (d. 1850) 
1850 - Dec 1854            Vacant 
1854 - 1856                Lai Hka                            (d. 1856)
1856 - 1881                Sao Waing (1st time)               (b. 1846 - d. 1896)
1881 - 1886                Sai Pwin -Regent
1886 - Jan 1887            Sao Waing (2nd time)               (s.a.) 
Jan 1887 - Oct 1887        Bo Saing -Regent 
 9 Oct 1887 - 1900         Hkun Nu                            (b. 18.. - d. 1900) 
1900 - 1946                Sao Hkun Nsok                      (b. 1863 - d. 1946)
1946 - 1952                Sao Hkun So

References

External links
"Gazetteer of Upper Burma and the Shan states"
The Imperial Gazetteer of India

Shan States
1630 establishments in Asia

ca:Lawksawk